The Portuguese ruled territories of Goa, Daman and Diu were invaded and successfully annexed through Operation Vijay into the Republic of India on 19 December 1961. Since then, elections in the state are conducted in accordance with the Constitution of India to elect representatives of various bodies on national, state and district levels.

Electoral system

National level

Lok Sabha

Goa has two Lok Sabha constituencies; North Goa and South Goa, none of which are reserved for Scheduled Castes or Scheduled Tribes.

Keys:

Rajya Sabha

State level

Legislative Assembly

The Goa Legislative Assembly has 40 constituencies of which only one is reserved for Scheduled Caste.

Political parties

References